St. James Colored Methodist Episcopal Church (St. James C.M.E. Church; St. James Christian Methodist Episcopal Church) is a historic church at 408 N. Border Avenue in Tyler, Texas, United States.  It was built in 1920 and added to the National Register of Historic Places in 2004.

See also

National Register of Historic Places listings in Smith County, Texas

References

African-American history of Texas
Christian Methodist Episcopal churches
Churches in Smith County, Texas
Houses in Smith County, Texas
Methodist churches in Texas
Churches on the National Register of Historic Places in Texas
1920 establishments in Texas
National Register of Historic Places in Smith County, Texas